Don Chan Palace is a hotel in Vientiane, Laos, established in 2004. Legislation by the Vientiane government had attempted to ensure that the seven story Patuxai monument would remain the tallest building, but the hotel developers evaded legal restrictions by building the hotel on an outcrop along on the Mekong River. The rooms of the hotel are described by Frommers as having a "muted colors with few traditional Lao furnishings". Due to its 14 floors, the hotel is an important business venue and has hosted some notable events such as Billiards and snooker at the 2009 Southeast Asian Games.

References

External links

Official site

Hotels in Vientiane
Hotels established in 2004
Laotian companies established in 2004